Im Jong-seok (born 24 April 1966) is a South Korean politician and former Chief of Staff for Moon Jae-in currently serving as Moon's Special Advisor for Foreign Affairs and Special Envoy to UAE. Im served as Moon's chief of staff during the primary and 2017 presidential election.

Im previously served as vice/deputy mayor for political/state affairs under Seoul Mayor Park Won-soon, a two-term member of the National Assembly, and secretary-general of the Democratic Party of Korea. He was a prominent student activist in the pro-democracy movement during the 1980s. Im was head of the National Council of Student Representatives in 1989 and served three and a half years in prison for facilitating Lim Su-kyung's unauthorized visit to North Korea in violation of the National Security Law.

Im supports engagement with North Korea.

Personal life
Im was born in Jangheung, South Jeolla in 1966. He is married with one daughter.

See also
 Chief Presidential Secretary

References

Minjoo Party of Korea politicians
Members of the National Assembly (South Korea)
Jangheung Im clan
1966 births
Living people
Chiefs of Staff to the President of South Korea